Palmer Cord Tyres was an English tyre manufacturer created in 1895. In 1914 René Thomas drove a Delage car  to victory in the Indianapolis 500, wearing Palmer Cord tyres.

References

Tyre manufacturers of England
Manufacturing companies established in 1895
1895 establishments in England